Baron Brooke is a title in the Peerage of England. It was created in 1621 and was absorbed into the Earldom of Warwick in 1759.

History
The title was created in 1621 for Fulke Greville, who was already 5th Baron Willoughby de Broke. Greville was a favourite courtier of Queen Elizabeth and served under her and King James I as Treasurer of the Navy and as Chancellor of the Exchequer. He was also a poet and dramatist. Greville obtained from James I a grant of Warwick Castle, and in 1621 he was raised to the Peerage of England as Baron Brooke, of Beauchamps Court in the County of Warwick, with remainder to his second cousin (once removed), and adopted son, Robert Greville. Lord Brooke never married and on his death in 1628 the barony of Willoughby de Broke was passed on to his sister Margaret.

He was succeeded in the barony of Brooke according to the special remainder by Robert Greville, who became the second Baron. He was the grandson of Robert Greville, younger son of Sir Fulke Greville (d. 1569) and Elizabeth, 3rd Baroness Willoughby de Broke. He was a prominent Parliamentarian commander in the Civil War. Lord Brooke was killed during the siege of Lichfield Cathedral in 1643. 
His younger son, the fourth Baron, was one of the six commissioners deputed to invite the return of Charles II in 1660 and also served as Lord Lieutenant of Staffordshire. He outlived all of his six sons and was succeeded by his younger brother, the fifth Baron. 
He represented Warwick in the House of Commons.
His grandson and successor, the sixth Baron, died from fever at an early age and was succeeded by his younger brother, the seventh Baron.
His third but eldest surviving son, the eighth Baron, was Lord Lieutenant of Warwickshire. In 1746 he was created Earl Brooke, of Warwick Castle, in the Peerage of Great Britain. The earldom of Warwick created in 1618 for a member of the Rich family became extinct in September 1759, and in November of the same year Lord Brooke was created Earl of Warwick in the Peerage of Great Britain.

From this point the history of the barony was tied to the history of the Earldom of Warwick.

Barons Brooke (1621)
Fulke Greville, 1st Baron Brooke, 5th Baron Willoughby de Broke (1554–1628)
Robert Greville, 2nd Baron Brooke (1607–1643)
Francis Greville, 3rd Baron Brooke (d. 1658) 
Robert Greville, 4th Baron Brooke (c. 1638–1677) 
Fulke Greville, 5th Baron Brooke (1643–1710)
Fulke Greville, 6th Baron Brooke (1693–1711)
William Greville, 7th Baron Brooke (1695–1727)
Francis Greville, 8th Baron Brooke (1719–1773) (created Earl Brooke in 1746 and Earl of Warwick in 1759)

See the earls of Warwick for further holders

See also
Baron Brooke of Alverthorpe
Baron Brooke of Cumnor
Baron Brooke of Oakley
Baron Brooke of Sutton Mandeville
Baroness Brooke of Ystradfellte
Brooke baronets

References

Kidd, Charles, Williamson, David (editors). Debrett's Peerage and Baronetage (1990 edition). New York: St Martin's Press, 1990.

External links

www.thepeerage.com

Brooke
Brooke
Greville family
Brooke